Revealed is the fourth studio album (and tenth overall) by American gospel singer-songwriter Deitrick Haddon. It was released on September 2, 2008, on Verity Records and Zomba Gospel.

Revealed reached number 98 on the Billboard 200 and number 2 on the Top Gospel Albums chart. Three singles were released in support of the album: "I'm Alive" (number 19, Top Gospel Songs), "Love Him Like I Do" featuring Ruben Studdard and Mary Mary (number 2, Top Gospel Songs) and "I Need Your Help".

Track listing

 "Where You Are" (Vidal Davis / Deitrick Haddon / Andre Harris) (3:19)
 "I'm Alive" (Eric Dawkins / Deitrick Haddon) (3:55)
 "Go With Me" (Eric Dawkins / Deitrick Haddon) (3:19)
 "It's Raining" (Deitrick Haddon) (3:40)
 "Running to You" (Deitrick Haddon) (4:42)
 "I Need Your Help" (Deitrick Haddon / Gerald Haddon) (4:51)
 "Don't Take Your Spirit Away" (Damita Haddon / Deitrick Haddon) (3:54)
 "Ungrateful" (David Haddon / Deitrick Haddon) (3:50)
 "One Blood" (Vidal Davis / Deitrick Haddon / Andre Harris) (5:10)
 "Reveal My Heart" (Tim Kelley, Bob Robinson, Deitrick Haddon) (4:28)
 "Let Me Go" (Tim Kelley, Bob Robinson, Deitrick Haddon) (4:43)
 "Soul Survivor" (Vidal Davis / Deitrick Haddon / Andre Harris) (4:59)
 "Jesus For President" (Deitrick Haddon) (4:37) 
 "Love Him Like I Do" (Featuring Ruben Studdard & Mary Mary) (Erica Campbell / Warryn Campbell / Lamar Edwards / Deitrick Haddon) (3:18)
 "The Word" (Deitrick Haddon / Alvin Williams) (5:27)

Deitrick Haddon albums
2008 albums
Albums produced by Tim & Bob